James Albertus McClure (December 27, 1924 – February 26, 2011) was an American lawyer and politician from the state of Idaho, most notably serving as a Republican in the U.S. Senate for three terms.

Early life and education
McClure attended public schools in Payette and joined the U.S. Navy at age 18 during World War II, serving from 1942 to 1946. McClure graduated from the Navy Program at the University of Idaho–Southern Branch (now Idaho State University) in Pocatello in 1943. After his discharge from the Navy, he entered the College of Law at the University of Idaho and graduated in 1950.

Career
From 1950 to 1956, he served as prosecuting attorney for Payette County; he also served as city attorney for Payette from 1953 to 1966. During this span, he was also a member of the Idaho State Senate, serving from 1961 to 1966.

In the 1966 election, McClure ran for the U.S. House from Idaho's first Congressional district. He won the race, defeating incumbent Compton I. White, Jr., and was re-elected in 1968 and 1970.

U.S. Senate
McClure ran for the open U.S. Senate seat (Class II) in 1972, vacated by the retirement of Len Jordan. In the general election he defeated the Democratic nominee, William E. "Bud" Davis, the president of Idaho State University. McClure was reelected by wide margins in 1978 and 1984. The seat was occupied by William Borah for over three decades (1907–1940), and has been continuously held by Republicans since 1949.

In 1981, McClure joined Republican colleagues Jesse Helms of North Carolina and fellow Idaho senator Steve Symms in an unsuccessful fight to return to a purchase requirement for participation in the food stamp program. Helms cited a Congressional Budget Office study which showed that 75 percent of the increase in food stamp usage had occurred since the purchase requirement was dropped in 1977. Senators voted 33 to 66 against the Helms-McClure position. "It's obvious the majority of the Senate is not really concerned about constraining the growth of the food-stamp program," McClure said.

In 1984 McClure ran for Senate Majority Leader, but was defeated by Senator Bob Dole of Kansas, who three years earlier had led the intraparty opposition to the Helms-McClure position on reinstating the purchase requirement for food stamps.

During his 18 years in the Senate, McClure served as the chairman of the Committee on Energy and Natural Resources from 1981 to 1987. In this capacity McClure emerged as an early proponent of electric cars and energy independence. He also chaired the Senate Republican Conference from 1981 to 1985.

Retirement
At age 65, McClure declined to run for a fourth term in 1990. Republican congressman Larry Craig of Midvale easily won McClure's Senate seat in November 1990 and served three terms, succeeded by Jim Risch.

After leaving the Senate, McClure became a mining consultant and lobbyist in Washington, D.C., founding the firm of McClure, Gerard, & Neuenschwander. Up until his death, McClure maintained a residence in McCall.

In October 1995 the new home of the College of Mines and Earth Resources at the University of Idaho was dedicated as James A. McClure Hall. On December 12, 2001, the Federal Building and U.S. Courthouse in Boise was renamed for McClure.

Personal life 
In December 2008, the 83-year-old McClure suffered a stroke and was sent to the intensive care unit at Saint Alphonsus Regional Medical Center in Boise. Although initially he was expected to recover, McClure died at the age of 86 on February 26, 2011.

Election results

References

External links 

Federal Bldg. (1968) Boise, Idaho – renamed for James A. McClure, 2001
University of Idaho – James A. and Louise McClure Center for Public Policy Research
University of Idaho – Senator James McClure
University of Idaho Library – Papers of Senator James A. McClure

1924 births
2011 deaths
People from Payette, Idaho
Republican Party members of the United States House of Representatives from Idaho
Republican Party United States senators from Idaho
Republican Party Idaho state senators
20th-century American politicians
American prosecutors
American lobbyists
Idaho lawyers
University of Idaho alumni
Idaho State University alumni
University of Idaho College of Law alumni
United States Navy personnel of World War II
20th-century American lawyers